Ted Heijckmann (born 24 November 1991) is a Dutch professional footballer, who currently plays for Achilles '29 in the Dutch Topklasse. He is a former player of Vitesse Arnhem in his town of birth, Arnhem.

External links
 

1991 births
Living people
Dutch footballers
SBV Vitesse players
Footballers from Arnhem
Association football wingers